Mammamia! (from the interjection, meaning "My mother!") was an Italian television series, consisting of 30 non-dialogical episodes lasting 8 minutes each. Premiering in 2003–2004, it starred Angela Finocchiaro, who played the role of a mother dealing with the everyday troubles of her 4-, 7-, and 13-year-old children.

Main cast and roles

See also
List of Italian television series

External links
 

Italian television series
RAI original programming